is a 1975 Japanese animated short film created by Go Nagai and produced by Toei Doga. It was originally shown along with the short film Great Mazinger tai Getter Robot G: Kuchu Daigekitotsu, also from Toei and Nagai. The film is considered the prototype for the future anime television series UFO Robot Grendizer, which premiered the same year.

Yaban Forces
The Yaban forces originate from a planet of the same name and primarily consist of green compact saucers that fire orange lasers, bladed discs, chains, and can morph into wingless dragons or tanks, blue saucers that fire missiles, and the main command ship called the Quinn Byrne. After the destruction of planet Fleed, one of the last survivors, Duke Fleed, stole an experimental giant robot named Gattaiger and fled to Earth where the Yaban attacked every major city. The Yaban forces eventually confront Duke Fleed and the Gattaiger near the end of the movie. Gattaiger's powers include faster than light flight, Spider Spin (a buzzsaw mode used by the Flying Tiger), Needle Shower (needle missiles from the Flying Tiger), Space Thunder (three lasers from each side of the Flying Tiger), and Thunder Focus (combining all six beams into one). After the death of Duke's fiancé, Telonna, he leaves Earth with the Gattaiger.

Staff
Original plan/Original work: Go Nagai, Dynamic Production
Original plan: Sacre Burn (pen name of the producers group)
Director: Yugo Serikawa
Scenario: Shozo Uehara
Planning: Ken Ariga, Mineo Souda
Producer: Chiaki Imada
Animation director: Akira Sakano
Assistant director: Yoichi Kominato
Art director: Fumihiro Uchikawa
Music: Shunsuke Kikuchi
Theme songs lyrics: Kogo Hotomi
Theme songs performance: Isao Sasaki
Theme Song: "Tatakae! Uchu no Oja"
Vice theme song: "Moeru Ai no Hoshi"
Cast: Isao Sasaki (Duke Freed/Daisuke Umon), Noriko Ohara (Telonna), Minori Matsushima (Hikaru Makiba), Mari Shimizu (Goro Makiba), Kenji Utsumi (Blackey), Yasuo Hisamatsu (Genzo Umon)

See also
UFO Robot Grendizer

External links
Space Disk War at Toei's corporate website

1975 anime films
1975 manga
Go Nagai
Anime short films
1970s animated short films
Kodansha manga
Akita Shoten manga
Toei Animation films
Films directed by Yûgo Serikawa